The 1977 Individual Speedway Junior European Championship was the inaugural edition of the European Under-21 Championships.

European Final
July 24, 1977
 Vojens, Vojens Speedway Center
 only 12 heats - abandoned due to rain, result stands

References

1977
European Individual U-21
Speedway competitions in Denmark
1977 in Danish motorsport